The Chill Factor may refer to:

 A Cold Night's Death, a 1973 television horror film starring Robert Culp and Eli Wallach
 The Chill Factor, a 1993 supernatural horror film, also known as Demon Possessed